Hugh Barton (born 21 November 1939) is a New Zealand cricketer. He played in two first-class matches for Northern Districts in 1957/58.

References

External links
 

1939 births
Living people
New Zealand cricketers
Northern Districts cricketers
Cricketers from Gisborne, New Zealand